This article shows all the songs that has been number one on the official Danish singles chart, Tracklisten, in 2010, as compiled by Nielsen Music Control in association with the Danish branch of the International Federation of the Phonographic Industry (IFPI).

Chart history

See also
2010 in music

References

2010 in Denmark
Denmark
2010